Bojadła  is a village in County Lubuskie, Lubusz Voivodeship, in western Poland. It is the seat of the gmina (administrative district) called Gmina Bojadła.

The village has a population of 1,200.

History
The village was first mentioned at the end of the twelfth century.

References

Villages in Zielona Góra County